Zhang Yue (born 16 November 1999) is a Chinese footballer currently playing as a defender for Chinese Super League side Cangzhou Mighty Lions.

Career statistics

Club

Notes

References

1999 births
Living people
Chinese footballers
Chinese expatriate footballers
Association football defenders
Serbian First League players
Chinese Super League players
UE Cornellà players
Beijing Renhe F.C. players
FK Sinđelić Beograd players
FK Bežanija players
Cangzhou Mighty Lions F.C. players
Chinese expatriate sportspeople in Spain
Expatriate footballers in Spain
Chinese expatriate sportspeople in Serbia
Expatriate footballers in Serbia